= Ranunculus multiscapus =

- Ranunculus multiscapus with flowers from the Old Man Range, South Island

Scientific classification
- Kingdom: Plantae
- Clade: Tracheophytes
- Clade: Angiosperms
- Clade: Eudicots
- Order: Ranunculales
- Family: Ranunculaceae
- Genus: Ranunculus
- Species: R. multiscapus

Binomial name
- Ranunculus multiscapus Hook.f.

Species of flowering plant

Ranunculus multiscapus is a species of flowering plant in the buttercup family, Ranunculaceae, endemic to New Zealand and found on the North Island and South Island.
